The Party Machine with Nia Peeples is a half-hour late-night American musical variety show that aired in syndication for one season in 1991. The show was hosted by Nia Peeples and executive produced by Arsenio Hall.

History

Background
Arsenio Hall created The Party Machine as a televised afterparty to his own program, The Arsenio Hall Show, and to be a late-night alternative to Club MTV. 
Hall built the half-hour show around Nia Peeples, who previously hosted MTV's Friday night Street Party series and the short-lived US adaptation of Top of the Pops. 
The Party Machine set featured live music venues, multi-level dance floors, conversation pits, a VIP room, a non-alcoholic bar and a resident DJ. Music videos were introduced by Peeples, who also served as a dancer/choreographer.  
The show, sold to markets as a companion piece to Hall's talk show, aired weeknights in syndication beginning January 7, 1991 on approximately 150 stations. 
In addition to Club MTV, its format brought comparisons to Soul Train, Dance Party USA and American Bandstand.

Guests
Party Machine aimed to be a showcase for established and breaking urban dance acts. New Jack Swing singing group Troop was the show's first guest. 
Other music acts who performed on the show include The Boys, Tevin Campbell, Taylor Dayne, Sheena Easton, En Vogue, Guy, LeVert, MC Hammer, Alexander O'Neal,  Maxi Priest, Will Smith, Ralph Tresvant and Vanilla Ice. The show also featured comedians and actors such as Sinbad and David Faustino.

Ratings
Initially, ratings for Party Machine were solid and on several occasions beat Late Night head-to-head in Atlanta, New York, Detroit, Miami and Washington. Viewership gradually dipped, however, and in June the show was cancelled. The final episode aired on September 15, 1991.

See also
 List of late-night American network TV programs

References

1991 American television series debuts
1991 American television series endings
1990s American variety television series
1990s American music television series
American television spin-offs
Dance television shows
English-language television shows
First-run syndicated television programs in the United States
Television series by CBS Studios